Dawat E Shaadi is an Indian romantic melody drama film, written and directed by Syed Hussain, produced by Syed Waseem Yaba and distributed by Rajshri Productions. It stars Adnan Sajid Khan, Aziz Naser and Mast Ali in lead roles.

Plot

Cast
 Adnan Sajid Khan as Gore Bhai
 Aziz Naser as Abbas
 Mast Ali as Mastan

References

External links

 Trailer of Dawat E Shaadi on YouTube

Films about Indian weddings
2010s Hindi-language films